Nicola Rizzoli (born 5 October 1971) is an Italian former football referee who refereed in the Italian Serie A from 2002 to 2017 and was a FIFA-listed referee from 2007 to 2017. He refereed the 2014 FIFA World Cup Final between Germany and Argentina on 13 July at the Estádio do Maracanã and the 2013 Champions League Final between Borussia Dortmund and Bayern Munich at Wembley Stadium. Rizzoli won seven consecutive AIC Serie A Referee of the Year Awards from 2011 to 2017. On 18 February 2017, Soccer 360 included Rizzoli on its list of the top 5 referees in the 21st century.

Career
Rizzoli refereed his first UEFA Champions League qualifying match in August 2007 and took charge of his first Champions League group stage match, a 2–0 Sporting CP victory over Basel, on 1 October 2008. On 7 April 2010, Rizzoli took charge of the Champions League quarter-final second leg between Manchester United and Bayern Munich. With the score at 3–1 to Manchester United (4–3 on aggregate), Rizzoli sent off their right-back, Rafael, for a second bookable offence. Bayern then scored again and won the tie on away goals.

On 5 May 2010, Rizzoli refereed the Coppa Italia Final between Inter and Roma. On 12 May, Rizzoli refereed the 2010 UEFA Europa League Final, as Atlético Madrid defeated Fulham 2–1.

On 6 August 2011, Rizzoli refereed the Supercoppa Italiana Final between Milan and Inter.

In May 2013, Rizzoli was selected by UEFA to referee the 2013 Champions League Final at Wembley.

At the international level, Rizzoli served as a referee at UEFA Euro 2012 and officiated in qualifiers for the 2010 and 2014 World Cups. FIFA named Rizzoli to its list of 52 candidate referees for the 2014 FIFA World Cup in Brazil. Rizzoli was selected and was the head referee for a group stage match between Spain and the Netherlands. He refereed the 2014 FIFA World Cup Final between Germany and Argentina on 13 July at the Estádio do Maracanã.

Rizzoli was named the 2014 and 2015 World's Best Referee by IFFHS.

On 15 September 2015, Rizzoli was in charge of the UEFA Champions League Group Stage match between PSV Eindhoven and Manchester United where PSV's Héctor Moreno broke the leg of Manchester United defender Luke Shaw. His decision not to show Moreno a red card for the tackle was controversial. UEFA chief refereeing officer Pierluigi Collina reminded officials of their responsibility to player safety after the incident.

In December 2015, Rizzoli was named one of the eighteen referees appointed for UEFA Euro 2016.

On 4 July 2017, Rizzoli retired as referee, although eligible for one more year, and was appointed as the head Serie A designator.

Personal life
When he was not refereeing, Rizzoli worked as an architect.

Honours
Serie A Referee of the Year (7): 2011, 2012, 2013, 2014, 2015, 2016, 2017
IFFHS World's Best Referee (2): 2014, 2015
Globe Soccer Award for the Best Referee of the Year (1): 2014
Italian Football Hall of Fame: 2018

References

External links
Profile at WorldReferee.com

 Nicola Rizzoli

1971 births
Living people
People from Mirandola
Italian football referees
UEFA Champions League referees
2014 FIFA World Cup referees
FIFA World Cup referees
FIFA World Cup Final match officials
21st-century Italian architects
UEFA Euro 2012 referees
UEFA Euro 2016 referees
Italian expatriate sportspeople in Ukraine
Sportspeople from the Province of Modena